Plateau Vision is a solo studio album by Lushlife. It was released on Western Vinyl on April 17, 2012. It includes guest appearances from Styles P, Heems, Shad, and Cities Aviv. Music videos were created for "Still I Hear the Word Progress" and "Magnolia".

Critical reception

At Metacritic, which assigns a weighted average score out of 100 to reviews from mainstream critics, the album received an average score of 79, based on 6 reviews, indicating "generally favorable reviews".

Jake Paine of HipHopDX gave the album a 4.0 out of 5, saying: "The artist knows he might not fit into the musical worlds that influenced him, but he pays homage to them without sacrificing much of his own dignity." Hari Ashurst of Pitchfork wrote, "there's enough of a sweet spot in the clean, backward-leaning production and offbeat samples to allow the record to distinguish itself as more than a sum of disparate parts."

Rhapsody placed it at number 8 on the "Top 20 Hip-Hop Albums of 2012" list. Stereogum placed it at number 25 on the "Top 40 Rap Albums of 2012" list.

Track listing

References

External links
 
 

2012 albums
Western Vinyl albums
Hip hop albums by American artists